Arhopala sophrosyne is a butterfly in the family Lycaenidae. It was described by Henley Grose-Smith in 1889. It is found in the Australasian realm (New Ireland, Guadalcanal, and Bougainville).

References

External links
Arhopala Boisduval, 1832 at Markku Savela's Lepidoptera and Some Other Life Forms. Retrieved June 3, 2017.

Arhopala
Butterflies described in 1889